Reger is a surname of German origin.

Reger may also refer to:

4347 Reger, an asteroid
Reger, Missouri
Reger, West Virginia
Reger-Chor, a German choir